Pat O'Connor (born 1965 in Coolderry, County Offaly) is an Irish retired sportsperson.  He played hurling with his local club Coolderry and was a member of the Offaly senior inter-county team from 1987 until 1996.

References

1965 births
Living people
Coolderry hurlers
Offaly inter-county hurlers
All-Ireland Senior Hurling Championship winners